Prospect Avenue may refer to:

Prospect Avenue (Kansas City, Missouri), a street that runs close to U.S. Route 71
Hollywood Boulevard, Los Angeles (named Prospect Avenue between 1887 and 1910)
Prospect Avenue (Brooklyn), New York City

New York City Subway stations
Prospect Avenue (IRT White Plains Road Line), in the Bronx; serving the  trains
Prospect Avenue (BMT Fourth Avenue Line), in Brooklyn; serving the  trains